The Jakarta–Merak Toll Road is a toll road connecting Jakarta and the Port of Merak (the westernmost point of Java) in Cilegon, Banten, Indonesia. It is generally used by people to travel back and forth between Sumatra (through ferry via the Sunda Strait) and the cities of Java. This toll road is also a part of Asian Highway 2.

History 

The Jakarta–Merak Toll Road is the second toll road to be opened in Indonesia after the Jagorawi Toll Road in 1978. The first westbound exit is located at Kebon Jeruk. It also has exits in Tangerang, Balaraja, Cikande, Ciujung, Serang, Pandeglang and Cilegon, before ending at Merak.

On 9 April 2017, the Karang Tengah toll gate was abolished due to constant traffic congestions around the vicinity.

Exits

References

Toll roads in Indonesia
Transport in Jakarta
Transport in Banten